Sahil is a village and municipality in the Garadagh raion of Baku, Azerbaijan. It had a population of 8,100 in 1974 and currently has a population of 23,900.

Notable natives 

 Emin Guliyev — National Hero of Azerbaijan.
 Rovshan Rzayev — National Hero of Azerbaijan.
 Tofiq Musayev - Mixed martial artist.

References

Populated places in Baku